is a Japanese footballer currently playing as a left winger or a left back for Urawa Red Diamonds.

Career statistics

Club
.

Notes

Honours

Club
Urawa Red Diamonds
Emperor's Cup: 2021
Japanese Super Cup: 2022

References

External links

1998 births
Living people
Association football people from Tochigi Prefecture
Kokushikan University alumni
Japanese footballers
Association football midfielders
J2 League players
J1 League players
Tochigi SC players
Urawa Red Diamonds players